James Wright (born 26 September 1949), more commonly known as Jim Wright, is a former Australian rules footballer who played for Geelong in the Victorian Football League (now known as the Australian Football League).

References

External links
 

1949 births
Living people
Geelong Football Club players
North Hobart Football Club players
Australian rules footballers from Tasmania